The Sri Lanka and Pakistan national cricket teams toured the United Arab Emirates (UAE) from 11 December 2013 to 20 January 2014. The tour included three Tests, five One Day Internationals (ODIs) and two Twenty20 Internationals (T20I) between Sri Lanka and Pakistan.

Squads

T20I series

Pakistan vs Afghanistan: Only T20I

Pakistan vs Sri Lanka: 1st T20I

Pakistan vs Sri Lanka: 2nd T20I

ODI series

1st ODI

2nd ODI

3rd ODI

4th ODI

5th ODI

Test series

1st Test

2nd Test

3rd Test

Statistics
Pakistan
Bilawal Bhatti took his 1st Test wicket when he got Kaushal Silva out in the first innings of the 1st Test.
Younus Khan made his 23rd Test century in the first innings of the 1st Test.
Misbah-ul-Haq made his 5th Test century in the first innings of the 1st Test.
Junaid Khan took his 50th Test wicket when he got Dinesh Chandimal out in the second innings of the 1st Test.
Misbah-ul-Haq passed 3,000 Test runs in the second innings of the 2nd Test.
Ahmed Shehzad made his 1st Test century in the first innings of the 3rd Test.
Azhar Ali made his 5th Test century in the second innings of the 3rd Test.

Sri Lanka
Angelo Mathews made his 2nd Test century in the second innings of the 1st Test.
Angelo Mathews passed 2,000 Test runs in the second innings of the 1st Test.
Mahela Jayawardene made his 32nd Test century in the first innings of the 2nd Test.
Prasanna Jayawardene passed 2,000 Test runs in the first innings of the 3rd Test.
Mahela Jayawardene passed 11,000 Test runs in the second innings of the 3rd Test.

Broadcasting rights

References

External links

Series page on Wisden India

2013 in Pakistani cricket
2014 in Pakistani cricket
2013 in Sri Lankan cricket
2014 in Sri Lankan cricket
2013 in Emirati cricket
2014 in Emirati cricket
International cricket competitions in 2013–14
Pakistani cricket seasons from 2000–01
2013-14
Sri Lanka 2014